Diamond Gulch is a gulch in eastern Juab County, Utah, United States.

Description
The gulch is located on the western slopes of the East Tintic Mountains. It begins at the northern base of Sunrise Peak, at the mouth of Water Canyon, at an elevation of  From there it runs west‑southwest through the ghost town of Diamond to the base of the East Tintic Mountains.

See also

 List of valleys of Utah

References

Valleys of Utah
Landforms of Juab County, Utah
Valleys of the Great Basin